Michael Gunther is a producer, director and writer.

Gunther started out in feature films after a career as a commercials director in Europe that spanned almost a decade, and included collaborations with Russell Boyd. He later turned his sights to documentary and feature films and started producing TV documentaries with his own company, including a portrait of acclaimed painter Hans Falk and an account of the devastating 1999 earthquake in Turkey. He wrote and directed The Honeytrap, starring British actress Emily Lloyd, in 2002.
 
He produced a number of independent features and shorts. Most recently he was co-producer for the feature film Anamorph, directed by Henry Miller and starring Willem Dafoe, Scott Speedman, Peter Stormare and Clea DuVall.

In 2006, he set up New York-based production company named Triboro Pictures with Sirad Balducchi.

Filmography
 The Honeytrap
 Anamorph
 She Wolf Rising
 Brief Reunion
 Quitters
 Quarter Life Crisis
 I Remember You Now...
 The Dueling Accountant
 Hans Falk (painter) - Painting the Light

External links

Triboro Pictures

Advertising directors
American film directors
American film producers
Living people
Year of birth missing (living people)